The Ningbo International Circuit is a motorsport race circuit near the Chinese city of Ningbo.

Events

The inaugural event was round of the China Formula 4 series in August 2017 before its international debut in October, when it replaced Shanghai International Circuit as the venue for the World Touring Car Championship Race of China.

 Current

 July: Porsche Sports Cup China
 August: F4 Chinese Championship, China GT Championship, China Endurance Championship
 September: F4 Chinese Championship, China GT Championship
 October: China Endurance Championship

 Former

 Asian Formula Renault (2018)
 Blancpain GT World Challenge Asia (2018)
 F3 Asian Championship (2018)
 Porsche Carrera Cup Asia (2021)
 TCR China Touring Car Championship (2017–2019)
 World Touring Car Championship FIA WTCC Race of China (2017)
 World Touring Car Cup FIA WTCR Race of China (2018–2019)

Lap records
The official race lap records at the Ningbo International Circuit are listed as:

Notes

References

External links
Satellite picture by Google Maps

World Touring Car Championship circuits
Motorsport venues in Zhejiang
Sports venues completed in 2017